The Chitty, also known as the Chetty or Chetti Melaka, are a distinctive group of Tamil people found mainly and originally in Melaka, Malaysia, and in Singapore where they migrated to in the 18th and 19th centuries from Melaka, who are also known as the "Indian Peranakans" and have adopted Malay (mostly) and Chinese cultural practices whilst also retaining their Hindu faith and heritage. In the 21st century, their population stands at 2,000. The Chitty/Chetti community or Chettiar community, is from South India and are devout Hindus.

Language
Like the Peranakans, the Chitty speak a Malay patois, which is mixed with many Tamil loan words. Many of the Chitty are unable to communicate in Tamil fluently.

History

Historical records stated that the Tamil traders from Panai in Tamil Nadu settled down in Melaka during the sovereignty of the Sultanate of Malacca. Like the Peranakans, they later settled down and freely intermingled with the local Malays and Chinese of Malay and Tamil ancestry settlers. However, with the fall of the Malacca Sultanate after 1511, the Chitty eventually lost touch with their native land.

Under the administration of the Portuguese, Dutch and British colonizers, the Chitty eventually began simplifying their culture and customs by adopting local customs. This can be evidenced in the architecture of the Sri Poyatha Moorthi Temple, which was built by Thaivanayagam Pillay, the leader of the Chitty people, in 1781 after the Dutch colonial government gave him a plot of land.

The traditional Chitty settlement is located at Kampung Tujuh along  Jalan Gajah Berang, which is also inhabited by a small number of Chinese of Tamilian ancestry and Malays as well. Many of the Chitty have since found jobs in Singapore and other parts of Malaysia.

The ethnic identity of the Chitty is nearly lost. As many of them are assimilating into the mainstream Indian, Chinese, and Malay ethnic communities culturally, this small but distinct group of people that has survived for centuries is now on the brink of extinction.

Exhibition of Peranakan Chitty history, antiques and culture can be seen at the Chitty Museum in Chitty Village, Melaka, Malaysia. Recently in 2013, there were controversies of development at the expense of demolishing part of Kampung Chitty, a historical and cultural village. A proposal to construct a condominium, a hotel and a road cutting through the village are seen as a threat affecting the residents and a temple built in 1827.

Religion

The Chitty are a tightly knit community of Saivite Hindus, worshipping in their three temples. Gods such as Ganesha and Shiva are worshipped in full gaiety. Hints of Taoist and Islamic influences are also evident in their religious rituals. As staunch believers of the Hindu faith, the 
Melakan Chitty community still upholds their religious ceremonies. They observe Deepavali, Ponggal, the Hindu New Year, Navratri and other traditional Hindu festivals that are celebrated by Hindu groups in Malaysia. However, the Chitty do not participate in Thaipusam at a grand level like most Hindu groups. During the month of May they have a similar festival to Thaipusam in their local temple called Mengamay. One celebration that is unique to the Chitty community is the Parchu festival. It is celebrated twice a year with Parchu Ponggal (Bhogi) observed the day before Ponggal in January and Parchu Buah-buahan during the fruit season between June and July.

Culture

Culturally, the Chitty have largely assimilated into the Malay culture with some Chinese, Dutch and Portuguese influences, although certain elements of Indian culture do remain. This is especially true in the case of marriages, where offerings of fruits and burning of incense are used. In the case of food, Malay spices, ingredients and the way of cooking have largely supplanted the Indian style. 

Chinese cultural influence on the Tamils is also evident, especially in the case of ancestral worship. Religious objects used for conducting rituals were also used by the Chinese. The Chitty are also influenced by the Chinese to some extent in their ceramics works of art.

Simplification of Tamil architecture among the Chitty is also present. Distinct from the Tamil, who have a complex Dravidian Temple Architecture in the Pallava style, that displays beautifully carved out sculptures of the Hindu gods in many rows, the Chitty temple tend to only have one row of these, or a picture of one single god in each of the three rows, as evidenced in the Sri Poyatha Moorthi Temple, built by Thaivanayagam Chitty in 1781.

Dress and lifestyle
Most of the Chitty have adopted the Malay costume. In the case of men, a comfortable sarong and Malay shirt may be worn, although a songkok may also be worn. Women, on the other hand, wear a similar costume that are similar to the Peranakan Nonya.

Alongside their Chinese of Tamilian ancestry and Malay neighbours, the Chitty live in Kampong houses. Pictures of Hindu gods and Indian names can be seen just outside their houses, as their descendants tend to adopt Indian, rather than Malay surnames.

A typical  Chitty home is distinctly marked by mango leaves arranged in a row, dangling from above the front door. Chitty temples are also adorned this way.

This is the old tradition still followed in Tamil Nadu from ancient period during functions.

Notable Chitty
 Raja Mudaliar
 S. R. Nathan
 Chaitanya Anand
 Thevanaigam Veerasimir Chitty 'David/Baba'

See also
 Peranakan

References

Further reading

External links
 Tamil Dravidian Architecture

Ethnic groups in Malaysia

Hindu ethnic groups

Tamil diaspora in Asia
People from Malacca
 
Hinduism in Malaysia
Immigration to Malaysia